Vadigenahalli Munishamappa Muniyapppa (born 20 April 1947) is an Indian politician who was the Minister of Sericulture department (1991), Minister of Energy (1993) and Minister of Mines & Geology (1999) in cabinet of S. Bangarappa, Veerappa Moily and S. M. Krishna respectively.  Currently he is a Member of the Legislative Assembly of the Sidlaghatta Constituency. He was contesting Member of the Legislative Assembly elections from Sidlaghatta (Vidhana Sabha constituency) of Chikkaballapur district since 1983 as a candidate of Indian National Congress.  He is the one of the senior leaders of Indian National Congress- Karnataka and elected six times as Member of the Legislative Assembly from Sidlaghatta.  As a token of honesty, sincerity, loyalty towards party he was selected as a candidate to contest Member of Legislative Assembly nine times and one time for Member of Parliament (1996).

Personal life

V. Muniyappa was born in an orthodox agricultural family, and was the elder son of V. Munishamappa (who was also an ex-village Panchayath chairman) and Smt. Pillamma born in Handiganala  village of Sidlaghatta taluk in undivided Kolar district (now in Chikkaballapur District). V. Muniyappa has married Smt. Ratnamma and has 2 sons and a daughter.

V.Muniyappa completed his schooling in Sidlaghatta Govt. school, and completed his matriculation in govt. school of Kolar, and studied Bachelor of science (B.Sc.) in Chintamani degree college and was active worker of national students union of India while pursuing his degree and inspired by Smt.

Political career

V. Muniyappa has begun his political career as a National Students Union of India (NSUI) worker while pursuing his degree at Taluk agricultural products co-operative Marketing society (TAPCMS) in 1967, then he became 2 times Director of PLD Bank. With this opportunity, he reached farmers to respond to their problems by sanctioning loans.

His active participation in society led Congress party to reward V. Muniyappa as a Youth Congress Taluk President in 1970–71, following Block Congress President in 1975-83 which helped Congress party as well as V. Muniyappa to establish Party from root level. With all his experience in 1983 he was elected as a Member of the Legislative Assembly for the first time. Then in 1989, 1994, 1999 he was consecutively elected 3 times as a Member of the Legislative Assembly. His works were rewarded with Minister of Sericulture department, Minister of Energy in cabinet of Shri.S. Bangarappa and Shri.Veerappa Moily respectively. In 1999 he was a cabinet minister of Minister of Mines & Geology in Shri. S. M. Krishna's government. At the time V. Muniyappa focused on addressing problems like roads, primary health care centers, power plants and holistic developments. In 2004, high command made him a General Secretary of Karnataka Pradesh Congress Committee, Member of AICC to rejuvenate Congress party all over the state. In 2013 he was chosen as Vice President of Karnataka Pradesh Congress Committee.

V. Muniyappa's contribution in initiating of water reserve provision budget and formation of water reserve provision panel by demanding government's was unmatchable. V. Muniyappa had unitedly supported irrigation protesters campaign to implement permanent irrigation scheme through massive bike rally from Sidlaghatta during Shri. Siddaramaiah’s government when he was Vice President of Karnataka Pradesh Congress Committee. Since then V. Muniyappa has focused on addressing problems of residents and farmers like water problems of district. In 2018 he was elected as Member of the Legislative Assembly for the sixth time and Congress-JDS allied government selected him as a Political Secretary to Chief Minister of Karnataka to guide in 2019. Meanwhile in the time of formation of BJP govt. according to some sources BJP offered him to join but he refused the opportunity to change over. During COVID-19 crisis he actively participates in prevention of COVID-19 cases in Sidlaghatta. Due to this in March 2020 he suffered seriously from COVID-19 which led to him being hospitalized. After the recovery from COVID-19 he immediately joined to serve his beloved voters.

Organizational activities and social service

 1963-1967 Active participant in National Students Union of India (NSUI)
 1967-1968	President of Taluk agricultural products co-operative Marketing society (TAPCMS)
 1968-1978	Director of PLD Bank (Two consecutive terms)
 1970-1975	Shidlagatta Youth Congress Taluk President
 1975-1983	Block Congress President

Mainstream politics 

 1983-1985	First time elected as a Member of the Legislative Assembly
 1989-1994	Second time Member of the Legislative Assembly and Minister of Sericulture department (1991) and Minister of Energy (1993)
 1994-1999	Only Congress Member of the Legislative Assembly elected from undivided Kolar, Chikkaballapur, District and served as General Secretary of Karnataka Pradesh Congress Committee.
 1999-2004	Minister of Mines & Geology and Ground Water development
 2004-2008	General Secretary of Karnataka Pradesh Congress Committee, Member of AICC
 2008-2013	Member of the Legislative Assembly for 5th time.
 2013-2018	Vice President of Karnataka Pradesh Congress Committee and Party In-Charge to Shimoga, Davanagere, Koppal, Chitradurga and Mangalore (5 District)
 2018	Elected as 6th Member of the Legislative Assembly time & worked as a Political Secretary to Chief Minister of Karnataka in cabinet of H. D. Kumaraswamy

References

Indian National Congress politicians from Karnataka
Living people
People from Chikkaballapur district
Kannada people
1947 births
Karnataka MLAs 1983–1985
Karnataka MLAs 1989–1994
Karnataka MLAs 1994–1999
Karnataka MLAs 1999–2004
Karnataka MLAs 2004–2007
Karnataka MLAs 2008–2013
Karnataka MLAs 2013–2018
Karnataka MLAs 2018–2023